The epiglottal or pharyngeal ejective is a rare type of consonantal sound, used in some spoken languages.

Features
Features of the pharyngeal ejective:

Occurrence
A pharyngeal ejective has been reported in Dargwa, a Northeast Caucasian language.

See also
 List of phonetics topics

References

Ejectives
Epiglottal consonants
Oral consonants
Central consonants